Stippled nails are characterized by small, pinpoint depressions in an otherwise normal nail, and may be an early change seen in psoriasis.

See also
Nail anatomy
 List of cutaneous conditions

References

 
Conditions of the skin appendages